This is a list of Fall 2008 New York Fashion Week fashion shows. This list includes shows on the official schedule ([a]) and those reviewed at style.com ([b]).

References

New York Fashion Week shows
2000s fashion
2008 in New York City
2008 in fashion
Fashion weeks
New York City-related lists
Fashion-related lists